Tayler Marshall (born 25 January 2000) is a British actor, best known for his role as Kenzo Harper in British situation comedy series My Family from 2005 to 2011, he appeared in My Family for 23 episodes over a period of 5 series and 5 years.

Career
Tayler Marshall was born on the 25th of January 2000, in Sutton, Surrey. His acting career started at the age of five when he was offered the role of 'Kenzo Harper' in BBCs 'My Family'. He went on to appear in 23 episodes over the 5 series. Since then, some of his work includes: 'A Young Doctor's Notebook' (Sky Arts), 'Hollyoaks' (Lime Pictures), 'Doctors' (BBC), feature film 'Jack the Giant Slayer' (Warner Bros.), two episodes of 'Casualty' (BBC) and the lead in short film 'Hot Guy Has Issues' (Rhino Films).

Filmography

Film

Television

References

External links
 Official website
 

2000 births
Living people
British male television actors